Evansville is an unincorporated community and census-designated place (CDP) in southwest Washington County, Arkansas, United States. It was first listed as a CDP in the 2020 census with a population of 102.

It is located in the Northwest Arkansas region on Arkansas Highway 59 near the Oklahoma state line.

History
A post office called Evansville has been in operation since 1838. The community was named after Captain Lewis Evans, a local merchant.

Education
The community is served by the Lincoln Consolidated School District. Lincoln High School is its sole high school.

Demographics

2020 census

Note: the US Census treats Hispanic/Latino as an ethnic category. This table excludes Latinos from the racial categories and assigns them to a separate category. Hispanics/Latinos can be of any race.

References

Unincorporated communities in Washington County, Arkansas
Unincorporated communities in Arkansas
Census-designated places in Washington County, Arkansas
Census-designated places in Arkansas